Former member clubs of the English Football League include football clubs who lost their status in the League by resigning, or by relegation, by becoming defunct, merging with another club, or joining the Premier League.

The English Football League comprises professional clubs from England and Wales, and was established in 1888 as The Football League (First Division). In 1892, the Second Division was formed. A Third Division was introduced in 1920, before being regionalised as North and South. In 1958 these became the national Third and Fourth Division. The Premier League superseded the First Division as the top-flight of the English football league system in 1992, with the other three divisions renamed the First, Second and Third Divisions. They were rebranded again in 2004 as the Championship, League One and League Two.

Until 1986, clubs could lose their League status by failing to gain re-election after finishing in the bottom four of the bottom division (fourth tier). From the 1986–87 season, the club finishing bottom was relegated to the Conference National (now National League), the highest level of non-League football, depending on the ability of the Conference champions to meet FA requirements. Since 2002–03, the bottom two clubs of League Two face relegation to the National League.

Clubs
The tables show the first and last seasons in which each club competed in the League.  Some clubs' membership was intermittent between their first and last seasons.

Clubs shown in bold were among the founder members of the League. As of 2022, the founder member clubs playing in the League are Blackburn Rovers, Bolton Wanderers, Burnley, Derby County, Preston North End, Stoke City, and West Bromwich Albion. Preston have continuously been League members, where as the others have played in the Premier League at one time or another.

Four former members of the old Football League Division One no longer play in the Football League or Premier League: Bradford Park Avenue, Darwen, Glossop North End, and Notts County.

Where a defunct club has been succeeded by a phoenix club, the new club is listed.

Former member clubs (no longer at English football levels 1–4)

Current members of the Premier League (2022–23)

See also
 List of Scottish Football League clubs
 Timeline of English football

Footnotes

References
General
 
 
 
 

Specific

History of football in England
England
Football